China participated in the 2012 Asian Beach Games in Haiyang, China on 16–22 June 2012.

China also won 14 gold medals, 10 silver medals, 12 bronze medals and a total of 39 medals, finishing first on the medal table.

3-on-3 basketball

grouplay

Semifinals

 Gold medal match

Beach Soccer 

Group play

Quarterfinals 

semifinals

Gold medal match

Power paragliding

External links
Competition Schedule

References

Nations at the 2012 Asian Beach Games
2012
Asian Beach Games